Iron Man is a 2008 American superhero film based on the Marvel Comics character of the same name. Produced by Marvel Studios and distributed by Paramount Pictures, it is the first film in the Marvel Cinematic Universe (MCU). Directed by Jon Favreau from a screenplay by the writing teams of Mark Fergus and Hawk Ostby, and Art Marcum and Matt Holloway, the film stars Robert Downey Jr. as Tony Stark / Iron Man alongside Terrence Howard, Jeff Bridges, Gwyneth Paltrow, Leslie Bibb, and Shaun Toub. In the film, following his escape from captivity by a terrorist group, world famous industrialist and master engineer Tony Stark builds a mechanized suit of armor and becomes the superhero Iron Man.

A film featuring the character was in development at Universal Pictures, 20th Century Fox, and New Line Cinema at various times since 1990, before Marvel Studios reacquired the rights in 2005. Marvel put the project in production as its first self-financed film, with Paramount Pictures distributing. Favreau signed on as director in April 2006, and faced opposition from Marvel when trying to cast Downey in the title role; the actor was signed in September. Filming took place from March to June 2007, primarily in California to differentiate the film from numerous other superhero stories that are set in New York City-esque environments. During filming, the actors were free to create their own dialogue because pre-production was focused on the story and action. Rubber and metal versions of the armor, created by Stan Winston's company, were mixed with computer-generated imagery to create the title character.

Iron Man premiered in Sydney on April 14, 2008, and was released in the United States on May 2, being the first film in Phase One of the MCU. It grossed over $585 million, becoming the eighth-highest grossing film of 2008. The film received praise from critics, especially for Downey's performance, as well as Favreau's direction, visual effects, action sequences, and writing. It was selected by the American Film Institute as one of the ten best films of 2008, received two nominations at the 81st Academy Awards for Best Sound Editing and Best Visual Effects. In 2022, the film was selected for preservation in the United States National Film Registry by the Library of Congress as being "culturally, historically, or aesthetically significant". Two sequels have been released: Iron Man 2 (2010) and Iron Man 3 (2013).

Plot
Tony Stark, who has inherited the defense contractor Stark Industries from his late father Howard Stark, is in war-torn Afghanistan with his friend and military liaison, Lieutenant Colonel James Rhodes, to demonstrate the new "Jericho" missile. After the demonstration, his convoy is ambushed and Stark is critically wounded by a missile used by the attackers—one of his company's own. He is captured and imprisoned in a cave by a terrorist group called the Ten Rings. Yinsen, a fellow captive and doctor, implants an electromagnet into Stark's chest to keep the shrapnel shards that wounded him from reaching his heart and killing him. Ten Rings leader Raza offers Stark freedom in exchange for building a Jericho missile for the group, but he and Yinsen believe that Raza will not keep his word.

Stark and Yinsen secretly build a small, powerful electric generator called an arc reactor to power Stark's electromagnet and a prototype suit of powered armor to aid in their escape. Although they keep the suit hidden almost to completion, the Ten Rings discover their hostages' intentions and attack the workshop. Yinsen sacrifices himself to divert them while the suit powers up. The armored Stark battles his way out of the cave to find the dying Yinsen, then burns the Ten Rings' weapons and flies away, crashing in the desert and destroying the suit. After being rescued by Rhodes, Stark returns home and announces that his company will cease manufacturing weapons. Obadiah Stane, his father's old partner and the company's manager, advises Stark that this may ruin Stark Industries and his father's legacy. In his home workshop, Stark builds a sleeker, more powerful version of his improvised armor suit as well as a more powerful arc reactor for it and his chest. Personal assistant Pepper Potts places the original reactor inside a small glass showcase. Though Stane requests details, a suspicious Stark decides to keep his work to himself.

At a charity event held by Stark Industries, reporter Christine Everhart informs Stark that his company's weapons were recently delivered to the Ten Rings and are being used to attack Yinsen's home village, Gulmira. Stark dons his new armor and flies to Afghanistan, where he saves the villagers. While flying home, Stark is attacked by two F-22 Raptors. He reveals his secret identity to Rhodes over the phone in an attempt to end the attack. Meanwhile, the Ten Rings gather the pieces of Stark's prototype suit and meet with Stane, who has been trafficking arms to the Ten Rings and has staged a coup to replace Stark as Stark Industries' CEO by hiring the Ten Rings to kill him. He subdues Raza and has the rest of the group killed. Stane has a massive new suit reverse-engineered from the wreckage. Seeking to track his company's illegal shipments, Stark sends Potts to hack into its database. She discovers that Stane hired the Ten Rings to kill Stark, but the group reneged when they realized they had a direct route to Stark's weapons. Potts meets with Agent Phil Coulson of S.H.I.E.L.D., an intelligence agency, to inform him of Stane's activities.

Stane's scientists cannot duplicate Stark's miniaturized arc reactor, so Stane ambushes Stark at his home and steals the one from his chest. Stark manages to get to his original reactor to replace it. Potts and several S.H.I.E.L.D. agents attempt to arrest Stane, but he dons his suit and attacks them. Stark fights Stane but is outmatched without his new reactor to run his suit at full capacity. The fight carries Stark and Stane to the top of the Stark Industries building, and Stark instructs Potts to overload the large arc reactor powering the building. This unleashes a massive electrical surge that causes Stane and his armor to fall into the exploding reactor, killing him. The next day, at a press conference, Stark publicly admits to being the superhero the press has dubbed "Iron Man".

In a post-credits scene, S.H.I.E.L.D. director Nick Fury visits Stark at home, telling him that Iron Man is not "the only superhero in the world", and explaining that he wants to discuss the "Avenger Initiative".

Cast

 Robert Downey Jr. as Tony Stark / Iron Man: An industrialist, genius inventor, and consummate playboy, he is CEO of Stark Industries and chief weapons manufacturer for the U.S. military. Director Jon Favreau felt that Downey's past made him an appropriate choice for the part and that the actor could not only make Stark a "likable asshole," but also portray an authentic emotional journey, once he had won over the audience. Favreau was also attracted to Downey because of his performance in Kiss Kiss Bang Bang. Downey frequently spoke with that film's director, Shane Black, about the script and dialogue in Iron Man. Downey had an office next to Favreau during pre-production, which allowed him greater involvement in the screenwriting process, especially when it came to adding humor to the film. Downey explained, "What I usually hate about these [superhero] movies [is] when suddenly the guy that you were digging turns into Dudley Do-Right, and then you're supposed to buy into all his 'Let's go do some good!' That Eliot Ness-in-a-cape-type thing. What was really important to me was to not have him change so much that he's unrecognizable. When someone used to be a schmuck and they're not anymore, hopefully they still have a sense of humor." To get into shape, Downey spent five days a week weight training and practiced martial arts, which he said benefited him because "it's hard not to have a personality meltdown ... after about several hours in that suit. I'm calling up every therapeutic moment I can think of to just get through the day."
 Terrence Howard as James "Rhodey" Rhodes: A friend of Stark's and the liaison between Stark Industries and the United States Air Force in the department of acquisitions, specifically weapons development. Favreau cast Howard because he felt he could play War Machine in a sequel. Howard prepared for the role by visiting Nellis Air Force Base on March 16, 2007, where he ate with the pilots and observed HH-60 Pave Hawk rescue helicopters and F-22 Raptors. While Rhodes is roguish in the comics after he meets Stark, his previous role as a disciplinarian creates a dynamic tension with Stark's character. He is unsure whether Stark's actions are acceptable. "Rhodey is completely disgusted with the way Tony has lived his life, but at a certain point he realizes that perhaps there is a different way," Howard said. "Whose life is the right way: Is it the strict military life, or the life of an independent?" Howard and his father are Iron Man fans, partly because Rhodes was one of the few black superheroes when Howard was a child. He has been a Downey fan since he saw him in Weird Science; the two competed physically on set.
 Jeff Bridges as Obadiah Stane: Stark's business second-in-command, mentor, and friend, who turns on him to take over the company, eventually building a giant exosuit to fight Stark. Bridges read the comics as a boy and liked Favreau's modern, realistic approach. He shaved his head, something he had wanted to do for some time, and grew a beard for the role. Bridges researched the Book of Obadiah, and was surprised to learn retribution is a major theme in that book of the Bible, something that Stane represents. Many of Stane's scenes were cut to focus more on Stark, but the writers felt Bridges's performance allowed the application of "less is more" when editing the film.
 Gwyneth Paltrow as Virginia "Pepper" Potts: Stark's personal assistant and budding love interest. Paltrow asked Marvel to send her any comics they would consider relevant to her understanding of the character, whom she considered to be very smart, level-headed, and grounded. She said she liked "the fact that there's a sexuality that's not blatant." Favreau wanted Potts' and Stark's relationship to be reminiscent of a 1940s comedy, something which Paltrow considered to be fun in an "innocent yet sexy" way.
 Leslie Bibb as Christine Everhart: A reporter for Vanity Fair.
 Shaun Toub as Ho Yinsen: Stark's fellow captive, who grafts an electromagnet to Stark's chest "to keep the shrapnel shell shards that wounded him from reaching his heart and killing him" and helps Stark build the first Iron Man suit.

Additionally, Faran Tahir appears as Raza, the leader of the Ten Rings; Paul Bettany voices J.A.R.V.I.S., Stark's personal AI system; and Clark Gregg appears as Phil Coulson, an agent of S.H.I.E.L.D. Will Lyman provides the voice-over during the opening award ceremony. Director Jon Favreau plays Harold "Happy" Hogan, Stark's bodyguard and chauffeur, and Samuel L. Jackson makes a cameo appearance as Nick Fury, director of S.H.I.E.L.D., in a post-credits scene. Jackson's face was previously used as the model for the Ultimate Marvel imprint version of Nick Fury. Other cameos in the film include Stan Lee as himself, being mistaken for Hugh Hefner by Stark at a party; Peter Billingsley as William Ginter Riva, a scientist who works for Stane; Tom Morello, who provided guitar music for the film, as a terrorist guard; and Jim Cramer as himself. Ghostface Killah, who often adopted Iron Man's name as an alias, had a cameo in a scene where Stark stays in Dubai, but the scene was cut for pacing reasons.

Production

Development
In April 1990, Universal Studios bought the rights to develop Iron Man for the big screen, with Stuart Gordon to direct a low-budget film based on the property. By February 1996, 20th Century Fox had acquired the rights from Universal. In January 1997, Nicolas Cage expressed interest in portraying the character, while in September 1998, Tom Cruise expressed interest in producing as well as starring in an Iron Man film. Jeff Vintar and Iron Man co-creator Stan Lee co-wrote a story for Fox, which Vintar adapted into a screenplay. It included a new science-fiction origin for the character, and featured MODOK as the villain. Tom Rothman, President of Production at Fox, credited the screenplay with finally making him understand the character. In May 1999, Jeffrey Caine was hired to rewrite Vintar and Lee's script. That October, Quentin Tarantino was approached to write and direct the film. Fox sold the rights to New Line Cinema the following December, reasoning that although the Vintar/Lee script was strong, the studio had too many Marvel superheroes in development, and "we can't make them all."

By July 2000, the film was being written for New Line by Ted Elliott, Terry Rossio, and Tim McCanlies. McCanlies' script used the idea of a Nick Fury cameo to set up his own film. In June 2001, New Line entered talks with Joss Whedon, a fan of the character, to direct, and in December 2002, McCanlies had turned in a completed script. New Line took a "unique" approach to writing the film's script, hiring David Hayter, David S. Goyer, and Mark Protosevich to "sit in a room and simply talk on camera about Iron Man for a few days". After this, Hayter was hired in 2004 to write a script. He reworked scripts that had been written by Jeff Vintar and Alfred Gough and Miles Millar, which had included the villain the Mandarin and Pepper Potts as a love interest. Hayter removed the Mandarin and instead chose to pit Iron Man against his father Howard Stark, who becomes War Machine. Hayter said "you want to try to mirror your hero with your villain as much as possible" for his reasoning behind making Howard the villain. He also made Bethany Cabe the film's love interest over Potts. In December 2004, the studio attached director Nick Cassavetes to the project for a target 2006 release. However, this deal ultimately fell through, and Iron Man's film rights returned to Marvel.

In November 2005, Marvel Studios worked to start development from scratch, and announced Iron Man as their first independent feature, because the character was their only major one not already depicted in live action. According to associate producer Jeremy Latcham, "we went after about 30 writers and they all passed," saying they were uninterested in the project due to both the relative obscurity of the character and the fact that it was solely a Marvel production. When the film did have a script, even the requests for rewrites met with many refusals. Early scripts for the film also directly referenced Sony Pictures' Spider-Man 2 (2004) by identifying Stark as the creator of Otto Octavius's bionic arms. In order to build the general public's awareness of Iron Man and elevate him to the same level of popularity as Spider-Man or Hulk, Marvel conducted focus groups, trying to find a way to remove the general perception that the character is a robot. The information Marvel received from the focus groups was used to formulate an awareness-building plan, which included releasing three animated short films ahead of the film's release. The shorts were called "Iron Man Advertorials", and were produced by Tim Miller and Blur Studio.

Pre-production
Jon Favreau was hired to direct the film in April 2006, celebrating getting the job by going on a diet, losing . Favreau had wanted to work with Marvel producer Avi Arad on another film after they both worked on Daredevil. The director found the opportunity to create a politically ambitious "ultimate spy movie" in Iron Man, citing inspiration from Tom Clancy, James Bond, and RoboCop, and compared his approach to an independent film—"[i]f Robert Altman had directed Superman"—and Batman Begins. Favreau wanted to make Iron Man a story of an adult man literally reinventing himself after discovering the world is far more complex than he originally believed. He changed the Vietnam War origin of the character to Afghanistan, as he did not want to do a period piece. Art Marcum & Matt Holloway were hired to write the script, while Mark Fergus & Hawk Ostby wrote another version, with Favreau compiling both teams' scripts, and John August then "polishing" the combined version. Comic book staff Mark Millar, Brian Michael Bendis, Joe Quesada, Tom Brevoort, Axel Alonso, and Ralph Macchio were also called upon by Favreau to give advice on the script. By July 2006, Matthew Libatique was attached to serve as cinematographer.

Favreau planned to cast a newcomer in the title role, as "those movies don't require an expensive star; Iron Man's the star, the superhero is the star. The success of X-Men and Spider-Man without being star-driven pieces reassures [executives] that the film does have an upside commercially." However, before the screenplay was prepared he had approached Sam Rockwell to play the part. Rockwell was interested, but Favreau changed his decision after the screen-test of Robert Downey, Jr. (Rockwell would later portray Justin Hammer in Iron Man 2 (2010)). In September 2006, Robert Downey, Jr. was cast in the role. Favreau chose Downey, a fan of the comic, because he felt the actor's past made him an appropriate choice for the part, explaining "The best and worst moments of Robert's life have been in the public eye. He had to find an inner balance to overcome obstacles that went far beyond his career. That's Tony Stark." Favreau faced opposition from Marvel in casting Downey, but would not take no for an answer, saying, "It was my job as a director to show that it was the best choice creatively ... everybody knew he was talented [and] certainly by studying the Iron Man role and developing that script I realized that the character seemed to line-up with Robert in all the good and bad ways." Downey earned $500,000 for the role. While preparing for filming, Favreau and Downey were given a tour of SpaceX by Elon Musk. Downey said, "Elon was someone Tony probably hung out with and partied with, or more likely they went on some weird jungle trek together to drink concoctions with the shamans."

Additional casting for the film occurred over the next few months: Terrence Howard was announced in the role of Stark's best friend James "Rhodey" Rhodes in October 2006; Gwyneth Paltrow was cast as love interest Virginia "Pepper" Potts in January 2007; and Jeff Bridges was cast in an undisclosed role in February. Don Cheadle had also been approached for the role of Rhodes, and would eventually replace Howard in the role starting with the sequel, Iron Man 2. Choosing a character to be the villain of the film was difficult, as Favreau felt Iron Man's arch-nemesis the Mandarin would not feel realistic, especially after Mark Millar gave his opinion on the script. The Mandarin had originally been envisioned as a rival to Tony Stark with a building of his own right next to Stark Industries, with the Mandarin eventually drilling a hole underneath Stark Industries to steal all of Stark's technology for himself; associate producer Jeremy Latchman described such story as "crazy terrible" and "underwhelming". Favreau felt only in a sequel, with an altered tone, would the fantasy of the Mandarin's rings be appropriate. The decision to push him into the background is comparable to Sauron in The Lord of the Rings, or Palpatine in Star Wars. Favreau also wanted Iron Man to face a giant enemy. The switch from Mandarin to Obadiah Stane was done after Bridges was cast in that role, with Stane originally intended to become a villain in the sequel. The Crimson Dynamo was also a villain in early drafts of the script. Favreau felt it was important to include intentional inside references for fans of the comics, such as giving the two fighter jets that attack Iron Man the call signs of "Whiplash 1" and "Whiplash 2", a reference to the comic book villain Whiplash, and including Captain America's shield in Stark's workshop.

Favreau wanted the film to be believable by showing the construction of the Iron Man suit in its three stages. Stan Winston, a fan of the comic book, and his company, who Favreau worked with on Zathura, built metal and rubber versions of the armor. The Mark I design was intended to look like it was built from spare parts. The back is less armored than the front, because Stark would use his resources for a forward attack. It also foreshadows the design of Stane's armor. A single  version was built, causing concern when a stuntman fell over inside it, though both the stuntman and the suit were unscathed. The armor was also designed to have only its top half worn at times. The animatronic required five operators for the arm, and was built on a gimbal to simulate walking. A scale model was used for the shots of it being built. The Mark II resembles an airplane prototype, with visible flaps. Iron Man comic book artist Adi Granov designed the Mark III with illustrator Phil Saunders. Granov's designs were the primary inspiration for the film's, and he came on board the film after he recognized his work on Jon Favreau's MySpace page. Saunders streamlined Granov's concept art, making it stealthier and less cartoonish in its proportions, and also designed the War Machine armor, but it was "cut from the script about halfway through pre-production." He explained that the War Machine armor "was going to be called the Mark IV armor and would have had weaponized swap-out parts that would be worn over the original Mark III armor," and that it "would have been worn by Tony Stark in the final battle sequence."

Filming
Production was based in the former Hughes Company soundstages in Playa Vista, Los Angeles, California. Howard Hughes was one of the inspirations for the comic book, and the filmmakers acknowledged the coincidence that they would film Iron Man creating the flying Mark III where the Hughes H-4 Hercules was built. Favreau rejected the East Coast setting of the comic books because many superhero films had already been set there.

Filming began on March 12, 2007, with Matthew Libatique serving as director of photography. The first few weeks of filming were spent on Stark's captivity in Afghanistan. Production designer J. Michael Riva saw footage of a Taliban fighter in Afghanistan, and saw the cold breath as he spoke: realizing remote caves are actually very cold, Riva placed an air conditioning system in the set. He also sought Downey's advice about makeshift objects in prison, such as a sock being used to make tea. Afterwards, Stark's capture was filmed at Lone Pine, and other exterior scenes in Afghanistan were filmed at Olancha Sand Dunes, where the crew endured two days of  winds. Filming at Edwards Air Force Base began in mid-April, and ended on May 2. In return for production assistance, the United States Department of Defense consulted on the film regarding certain scenes and dialogue depicting the military. This included changing Stark from being opposed to arms deals, to instead becoming one who sells his technology to the U.S. military. Exterior shots of Stark's home were digitally added to footage of Point Dume in Malibu, while the interior was built at Playa Vista, where Favreau and Riva aimed to make Stark's home look less futuristic and more "grease monkey". Filming concluded on June 25, 2007, at Caesars Palace in Las Vegas, Nevada. Favreau, a newcomer to action films, remarked, "I'm shocked that I [was] on schedule. I thought that there were going to be many curveballs". He hired "people who are good at creating action", so "the human story [felt] like it belongs to the comic book genre".

There was much improvisation in dialogue scenes, because the script was not completed when filming began (the filmmakers had focused on the story making sense and planning the action). Favreau felt that improvisation would make the film feel more natural. Some scenes were shot with two cameras to capture lines said on the spot. Multiple takes were done, as Downey wanted to try something new each time. It was Downey's idea to have Stark hold a news conference on the floor, and he created the speech Stark makes when demonstrating the Jericho weapon. Bridges described this approach as "a $200 million student film", and noted that it caused stress for Marvel executives when the stars were trying to come up with dialogue on the day of filming scenes. He also noted that in some instances, he and Downey would swap characters for rehearsal to see how their own lines sounded. The crew conceived a post-credits scene featuring Nick Fury and called Samuel L. Jackson to ask him if he would be interest in playing Fury, as Jackson had learned a few years ago that his likeness had been used for Fury in the Ultimate Marvel imprint. However, according to Latchman, Jackson originally appeared without any deal for him to reappear in later movies: "It was just this weird idea that maybe people give a shi-- if we stick it on the end". The dialogue for the Nick Fury cameo scene was also changed on set, with comic writer Brian Michael Bendis providing three pages of dialogue for the part, and the filmmakers choosing the best lines for filming on set. The Nick Fury cameo was filmed with a skeleton crew in order to keep it a secret, but rumors appeared on the Internet only days later. Marvel Studios President Kevin Feige subsequently had the scene removed from all preview prints in order to maintain the surprise and keep fans guessing. An alternate version of the Nick Fury post-credits scene was filmed in which he specifically said "As if gamma accidents, radioactive bugs bites and assorted mutants weren't enough" referencing Hulk, Spider-Man and the X-Men but this was cut due to legal problems with Sony Pictures and 20th Century Fox who at the time had full ownership of the characters until their reacquisition much later in the mid to late 2010s.

Post-production
Favreau's main concern with the film's effects was whether the transition between the computer-generated and practical costumes would be too obvious. He hired Industrial Light & Magic (ILM) to create the bulk of the visual effects for the film after seeing Pirates of the Caribbean: At World's End and Transformers. The Orphanage and The Embassy did additional work, with the latter creating a digital version of the Mark I armor. To help with animating the more refined suits, information was sometimes captured by having Downey wear only the helmet, sleeves and chest of the costume over a motion capture suit, and skydivers were filmed in a vertical wind tunnel to study the physics of flying. For shots of the Mark III flying, it was animated to look realistic by taking off slowly, and landing quickly. To generate shots of Iron Man and the F-22 Raptors battling, cameras were flown in the air to provide reference for physics, wind and frost on the lenses.

Music

Composer Ramin Djawadi had been a fan of the character Iron Man as a child, saying that he always liked superheroes "that actually don't have any superpowers". After Favreau's previous collaborator John Debney was unavailable to score the film, Djawadi sought out the role himself. Favreau had a clear vision of heavy metal music and guitars for the project, saying that Tony Stark was more of a rock star than a traditional superhero. Djawadi subsequently composed most of the film's score on guitar, before arranging it for orchestra. Djawadi had help with arrangements and additional cues from Hans Zimmer and Remote Control Productions, and Rage Against the Machine guitarist Tom Morello, who also makes a cameo appearance in the film, contributed guitar performances to the score. The film also features a big band-style arrangement of the Iron Man theme song from the 1966 cartoon The Marvel Super Heroes from frequent Favreau collaborators John O'Brien and Rick Boston. A soundtrack featuring Djawadi's score was released by Lions Gate Records on April 29, 2008.

Marketing

In July 2006, with the film still in pre-production, Favreau and Arad attended San Diego Comic-Con to promote the film, where the film's armor design, drawn by Adi Granov, was revealed along with the announcement that the Mandarin was intended to be the antagonist of the film. The following year, Favreau returned to San Diego Comic-Con to once again promote the film with Downey and Feige, where a teaser trailer was shown. With much of the visuals not yet ready, Favreau worked with ILM to have the flying shots ready, saying "I knew that I had to make a splash because there was zero anticipation for the film at the time". Stan Winston Studios also brought a life-sized replica of the film's armor to display at the convention.

Marvel and Paramount modeled their marketing campaign for Iron Man on that of Transformers. In May 2008, Sega released an official tie-in video game based on the film on multiple gaming platforms. Downey, Howard and Toub reprise their roles from the film. A 30-second spot for the film aired during a Super Bowl XLII break. Hasbro created figures of armor from the film, as well as Titanium Man (who appears in the video game) and the armor from the World War Hulk comics.

The 7-Eleven convenience store chain helped promote the film across the United States, and LG Group also made a sponsorship deal with Paramount. Worldwide, Burger King and Audi promoted the film. Jon Favreau was set to direct a commercial for the fast-food chain, as Michael Bay did for Transformers. In the film, Tony Stark drives an Audi R8, and also has an "American cheeseburger" from Burger King after his rescue from Afghanistan, as part of the studio's product placement deal with the respective companies. Three other vehicles, the Audi S6 sedan, Audi S5 sports coupe and the Audi Q7 SUV, also appear in the film. Audi created a tie-in website, as General Motors did for Transformers. Oracle Corporation also promoted the film on its site. Several tie-in comics were released for the film.

Release

Theatrical
Iron Man premiered at the Greater Union theater at George Street, Sydney, on April 14, 2008. The film began releasing in international markets on April 30, and was released in the United States on May 2, 2008. Iron Man was the first film released in Phase One of the MCU. The film was reformatted and screened in IMAX for the first time on August 30, 2018, as part of Marvel Studios' 10 year anniversary IMAX festival.

Home media
The film was released by Paramount Home Entertainment on DVD and Blu-ray Disc on September 30, 2008, in the United States and Canada, and October 27, 2008 in most of Europe. DVD sales were very successful, selling over 4 million copies the first week and generating a gross of over US$93 million. There were a total of 9 million copies sold and an accumulated total sales of over $160 million (not including Blu-ray). For the home releases of the film, the image on the newspaper Stark reads before he announces he is Iron Man had to be altered because of amateur photographer Ronnie Adams filing a lawsuit against Paramount and Marvel for using his on-location spy photo in the scene. A Walmart-exclusive release included a preview of Iron Man: Armored Adventures.

The film was also collected in a 10-disc box set titled "Marvel Cinematic Universe: Phase One – Avengers Assembled" which includes all of the Phase One films in the Marvel Cinematic Universe. It was released by Walt Disney Studios Home Entertainment on April 2, 2013. The IMAX Enhanced version of the film was made available on Disney+ beginning on November 12, 2021.

Reception

Box office
Iron Man earned $319 million in the United States and Canada and $266.8 million in other territories, for a worldwide gross of $585.8 million.

In its opening weekend, Iron Man grossed $98.6 million in 4,105 theaters in the United States and Canada, ranking first at the box office, giving it the eleventh biggest-opening weekend at the time, ninth-widest release in terms of theaters, and the third highest-grossing opening weekend of 2008 behind Indiana Jones and the Kingdom of the Crystal Skull and The Dark Knight. It grossed $35.2 million on its first day, giving it the thirteenth biggest-opening day at the time. Iron Man had the second-best premiere for a non-sequel, behind Spider-Man, and the fourth biggest-opening for a superhero film. Iron Man was also the number one film in the U.S. and Canada in its second weekend, grossing $51.2 million, giving it the twelfth-best second weekend and the fifth-best for a non-sequel. On June 19, 2008, Iron Man became that year's first film to pass the $300 million mark for the domestic box office.

Critical response

The website's critical consensus reads, "Powered by Robert Downey Jr.'s vibrant charm, Iron Man turbo-charges the superhero genre with a deft intelligence and infectious sense of fun." On Metacritic, the film has an average score of 79 out of 100, based on 38 critics, indicating "generally favorable reviews". Audiences polled by CinemaScore gave the film an average grade of "A" on an A+ to F scale.

Among the major trade journals, Todd McCarthy of Variety called the film an "expansively entertaining special effects extravaganza" with "fresh energy and stylistic polish", while Kirk Honeycutt of The Hollywood Reporter praised the film, while nonetheless finding "disappointment [in] a climatic  battle between different Iron Man prototypes ... how did Tony's nemesis learn how to use the suit?" In one of the first major-daily newspaper reviews, Frank Lovece of Newsday lauded the film's "emotional truth ... pitch-perfect casting and plausibly rendered super-science" that made it "faithful to the source material while updating it – and recognizing what's made that material so enduring isn't just the high-tech cool of a man in a metal suit, but the human condition that got him there". Roger Ebert of the Chicago Sun-Times gave the film four out of four stars, praising Downey Jr.'s performance and stating, "At the end of the day it's Robert Downey Jr. who powers the lift-off separating this from most other superhero movies". A. O. Scott of The New York Times called the film "an unusually good superhero picture. Or at least – since it certainly has its problems – a superhero movie that's good in unusual ways." Among the specialty press, Garth Franklin of Dark Horizons commended the "impressive sets and mechanics that combine smoothly with relatively seamless CG", and said, "Robert Downey Jr., along with director Jon Favreau ... help this rise above formula. The result is something that, whilst hardly original or groundbreaking, is nevertheless refreshing in its earnestness to avoid dark dramatic stylings in favor of an easy-going, crowd-pleasing action movie with a sprinkle of anti-war and redemption themes".

Among major metropolitan weeklies, David Edelstein of New York magazine called the film "a shapely piece of mythmaking ... Favreau doesn't go in for stylized comic-book frames, at least in the first half. He gets real with it – you'd think you were watching a military thriller", while conversely, David Denby of The New Yorker gave a negative review, claiming "a slightly depressed, going-through-the-motions feel to the entire show ... Gwyneth Paltrow, widening her eyes and palpitating, can't do much with an antique role as Stark's girl Friday, who loves him but can't say so; Terrence Howard, playing a military man who chases around after Stark, looks dispirited and taken for granted". IGN's Todd Gilchrist recognized Downey as "the best thing" in a film that "functions on autopilot, providing requisite story developments and character details to fill in this default 'origin story' while the actors successfully breathe life into their otherwise conventional roles".

Accolades

Roger Ebert and Richard Corliss named Iron Man as among their favorite films of 2008. It was selected by the American Film Institute as one of the ten best films of the year and by Empire magazine as one of The 500 Greatest Movies of All Time. Tony Stark was also selected by Empire as one of The 100 Greatest Movie Characters of All Time, and on their list of the 100 Greatest Fictional Characters, Fandomania.com ranked him at number 37. The Library of Congress selected Iron Man to be added to the National Film Registry in 2022, deeming it "culturally, historically, or aesthetically significant". Responding to the selection, Feige stated its inclusion on the Film Registry meant the film "has stood the test of time and that it is still meaningful to audiences around the world".

Sequels 

A sequel written by Justin Theroux and released in the United States on May 7, 2010, saw Favreau, Downey, Paltrow, and Jackson returning. Don Cheadle replaced Terrence Howard in the role of Colonel Rhodes, who is also seen as War Machine. Also starring are Mickey Rourke as villain Ivan Vanko, Sam Rockwell as Justin Hammer, and Scarlett Johansson as S.H.I.E.L.D. agent Natasha Romanoff. Walt Disney Studios and Marvel Studios released a second sequel on May 3, 2013, with Favreau opting to direct Magic Kingdom instead, but still reprising his role as Happy Hogan. Downey, Paltrow, and Cheadle also return, while Shane Black took over directing, from a screenplay by Drew Pearce. Guy Pearce also starred as Aldrich Killian, and Ben Kingsley as Trevor Slattery.

See also
 "What If... Killmonger Rescued Tony Stark?", an episode of the MCU television series What If...? that reimagines the events of this film
 List of films featuring powered exoskeletons

Notes

References

External links 

 
 
 
 
 
 'Iron Man' At 10: How One Film Set A Dominant Path For Marvel, Kevin Feige, Robert Downey Jr. & Jon Favreau at Deadline Hollywood

2000s American films
2000s English-language films
2000s superhero films
2008 science fiction action films
American science fiction action films
American science fiction adventure films
Films about arms trafficking
Films about businesspeople
Films about technological impact
Films about technology
Films about terrorism in Asia
Films about the United States Air Force
Films directed by Jon Favreau
Films produced by Avi Arad
Films scored by Ramin Djawadi
Films set in 2010
Films set in Afghanistan
Films set in Irvine, California
Films set in Los Angeles
Films set in Malibu, California
Films set in the Las Vegas Valley
Films shot in Los Angeles
Films shot in the Las Vegas Valley
Films using motion capture
Films with screenplays by Art Marcum and Matt Holloway
Films with screenplays by Mark Fergus and Hawk Ostby
IMAX films
Iron Man (film series)
Marvel Cinematic Universe: Phase One films
Paramount Pictures films
United States National Film Registry films
War in Afghanistan (2001–2021) films